Live in London is the first live album by American alternative singer-songwriter Regina Spektor, recorded at the Hammersmith Apollo, in London, during her Far Tour, and released worldwide through Sire Records on November 22, 2010.

The video was directed by Adria Petty, and is offered in DVD+CD, Blu-ray+CD, vinyl and digital format. It features 3 previously unreleased songs.

Track listing

Personnel
Regina Spektor - vocals, piano, keyboards, guitar 
Dave Heilman - drums
Kaoru Ishibashi - violin
Elizabeth Myers - viola
Yoed Nir - cello
Daniel Cho - cello, band leader
Technical
Rebecca Chandler - assistant engineer
Devin Sarna, Ron Shapiro, Sarah Roebuck, Tom Whalley - executive producer
Holly Tienken - design
Adria Petty - film direction

External links
 Live in London at Discogs
 Live in London at Sputnikmusic.com
 Live in London at IMDb

Regina Spektor albums
2010 albums
albums produced by David Kahne
Sire Records live albums
Albums recorded at the Hammersmith Apollo